Reese Lynch is a Scottish boxer. He competed at the 2021 AIBA World Boxing Championships, winning the bronze medal in the light welterweight division, and becoming the first Scottish boxer to win a medal at a senior World Championships.

References

External links 

Living people
Place of birth missing (living people)
Year of birth missing (living people)
Scottish male boxers
Light-welterweight boxers
AIBA World Boxing Championships medalists
Boxers at the 2022 Commonwealth Games
Commonwealth Games gold medallists for Scotland
Commonwealth Games medallists in boxing
Medallists at the 2022 Commonwealth Games